Albert William Jacobsen (10 September 1902 – 6 March 1989) was an Australian rules footballer who played with South Melbourne and Essendon in the Victorian Football League (VFL).

Jacobsen was a follower who came to South Melbourne via amateur club Leopold. He made two appearances in the 1925 VFL season but then didn't play a senior game in 1926, although he did win the Gardiner Medal for his efforts in the seconds. After featuring in only two rounds in 1927, he put together 11 appearances the following season.

From 1929 to 1930 he played for Brunswick and returned to the VFL in 1933 to play seven games with Essendon. He then played for Sunshine.

References

1902 births
Australian rules footballers from Victoria (Australia)
Sydney Swans players
Essendon Football Club players
Leopold Football Club (MJFA) players
Brunswick Football Club players
1989 deaths